Alain Bensoussan, born on 12 May 1940 in Tunis, is a French mathematician. He is Professor Emeritus at the University of Paris-Dauphine and Professor at the University of Texas at Dallas.

Biography 
Alain Bensoussan is a former student of the École polytechnique (X1960), a graduate of ENSAE and a doctor of mathematics from the Faculty of Sciences in Paris (1969) under the supervision of Jacques-Louis Lions. He was a lecturer at the École polytechnique from 1970 to 1986 and a professor at the École normale supérieure from 1980 to 1985. He was Director of the European Institute for Advanced Studies in Management, Brussels from 1975 to 1977. He was President of INRIA from 1984 to 1996, President of the National Centre for Space Studies (CNES) from 1996 to 2003, President of the Council of the European Space Agency (ESA) from 1999 to 2002.

Scientific works 
Alain Bensoussan's work has focused on automation and applied mathematics, but he has also focused on information and communication sciences and technologies as well as management and engineering sciences. He was one of the initiators of stochastic control for distributed systems and demonstrated in particular the principle of separation of estimation and control, which he then extended to differential sets. His former students include Peng Shige, Guy Pujolle, Étienne Pardoux, Jean-Michel Lasry.

Awards and honours 

 Member of the French Academy of Sciences
 Gay-Lussac Humboldt Prize (1984)
 IEEE Fellow (1985)
 Member of Academia Europaea (1985)
 Commandeur of the Ordre National du Mérite (2000)
 Member of the French Academy of Technologies (2000)
 Member of the International Academy of Astronautics (2001)
 Distinguished Public Service Medal, NASA (2001)
 Special award from the Association aéronautique et astronautique de France (2002)
 Officier of the Légion d'Honneur (2003)
 Officer of the Order of Merit of the Federal Republic of Germany (2003)
 SIAM Fellow, 2009
 Fellow of the American Mathematical Society (2012)
 Reid Award (2014)
 Top 2% most highly cited scientists

Alain Bensoussan Fellowship / Alain Bensoussan Career Development Enhancer
ERCIM - the European Research Consortium for Informatics and Mathematics - aims to foster collaborative work within the European research community and to increase co-operation with European industry. Leading European research institutes are members of ERCIM. The ERCIM Fellowship Programme has been established as one of the premier activities of ERCIM. The programme is open to young researchers from all over the world. It focuses on a broad range of fields in Computer Science and Applied Mathematics. This enables early-career scientists (obtained PhD degrees during the 8 years prior to the application year deadline) to conduct research at leading European centres outside their own country. Since its inception in 1991, over 750 fellows have benefited from the programme.  Since 2005, ERCIM Fellowships are named Alain Bensoussan Fellowships, in honour of Professor Alain Bensoussan.  The Alain Bensoussan Fellowship Programme has enabled bright young scientists from all over the world to work on challenging problems within ERCIM member institutes. The prestigious Alain Bensoussan Fellowships are co-funded by Marie Skłodowska-Curie Actions.  Throughout the programme, the fellows are supported by the ERCIM Human Resources Task Force to drive their personal development scheme and to assist them in their future career plans, whether in European research institutions or in European Industry. Moreover, given the strategic nature of this training scheme focusing on ICT and novel technologies, this Fellowship Programme also enhances its impact over European research and competitiveness at large.

References

External links 

20th-century French mathematicians
1940 births
People from Tunis
Members of the French Academy of Sciences
Fellows of the American Mathematical Society
Living people
Tunisian emigrants to France
21st-century French mathematicians